The queen danio or Fowler's danio (Devario regina) is a freshwater tropical fish belonging to the minnow family (Cyprinidae). Originating in India, Myanmar, Thailand, northwestern Malaya, and the Mekong River basin, this fish is sometimes found in community tanks by fish-keeping hobbyists.

Its diet consists of annelid worms, small crustaceans, and insects. The queen danio is oviparous.

See also
List of freshwater aquarium fish species

References

External links
Devario regina

Devario
Fish of Thailand
Fish described in 1934